Michigan's 4th House of Representatives district (also referred to as Michigan's 4th House district) is a legislative district within the Michigan House of Representatives located in the eastern portion of Wayne County, Michigan, including much of Detroit's Midtown and New Center neighborhoods, and all of the city of Hamtramck. The district was created in 1965, when the Michigan House of Representatives district naming scheme changed from a county-based system to a numerical one.

List of representatives

District Boundaries

Recent Elections

2020

2018

2016

2014

2012

2010

2008

2006

References 

Michigan House of Representatives districts
Government of Detroit